Andrew Noble (born 10 March 1984) is an alpine skier from Great Britain.  He competed for Great Britain at the 2010 Winter Olympics.  His best finish was a 29th place in the slalom.

References

External links
 
 
 
 

1984 births
Living people
British male alpine skiers
Scottish male alpine skiers
Olympic alpine skiers of Great Britain
Alpine skiers at the 2010 Winter Olympics